Australia have participated in the ABU Radio Song Festival twice. Commercial Radio Australia, Australia's radio industry body, has been the organiser of the Australian entry since the country's debut in the contest in 2012.

History

2012
Commercial Radio Australia is one of the founder members in the ABU Radio Song Festivals, having participated in the very first ABU Radio Song Festival 2012. Danielle Blakey was selected to represent Australia at the inaugural festival, she was the winner of N2AR (New Artists to Radio) a competition that finds unsigned talent and enables them to have commercial airplay. On 28 August 2014 it was announced that Danielle was to represent Australia. In Seoul Danielle finished in 2nd place and received the Gold Award.

2014
Australia participated in the festival again in 2014, Commercial Radio Australia used First Break to select their participant. First Break was a revamped version of N2AR which had been used to select Australia's 2012 participant. Iluka, the winner of First Break in 2012 was selected to sing "12th of July". The 2014 event was not competitive meaning that no prizes were given except for 'Tokens of Appreciation' to the performers as a sign of recognition of the diverse range of musical genre..

2015
Australia withdrew from the festival in 2015 and has not returned since then.

Participation overview 
Table key

See also 
 Australia in the ABU TV Song Festival
 Australia in the Eurovision Song Contest
 Australia in the Junior Eurovision Song Contest

References 

Countries at the ABU Song Festival